Christ's Chapel of God's Gift is a church in Dulwich, a district of London, within the College of God's Gift complex.

It was consecrated in 1616 by George Abbot, Archbishop of Canterbury, as the centre of Edward Alleyn's College of God's Gift which was to be established in 1619. It is one of two churches in the parish of Dulwich in the Archdeaconry of Southwark, more formally known as the Parish of St Barnabas with Christ's Chapel, together with St Barnabas' Church, Dulwich.

The organ, built in 1759, is the oldest surviving organ built by George England.

Gallery

References

External links 

17th-century Church of England church buildings
Dulwich
Churches completed in 1616
Dulwich
College of God's Gift